This is a list of results from every episode of WWE Tribute to the Troops.

Results

2003 
The 2003 edition of the special was taped on December 20 from Camp Victory in Baghdad, Iraq.

2004 
The 2004 edition of the special was taped on December 18 from Camp Speicher in Tikrit, Iraq.

2005 
The 2005 edition of the special was taped on December 9 from the Air Base in Bagram, Afghanistan.

2006 
The 2006 edition of the special was taped on December 8 from Camp Victory in Baghdad, Iraq.

2007 
The 2007 edition of the special was taped on December 7 from Camp Speicher in Tikrit, Iraq.

2008 
The 2008 edition of the special was taped on December 5 from Camp Victory in Baghdad, Iraq and aired on December 20 on NBC.

2009 
The 2009 edition of the special was taped on December 4 from Holt Memorial Stadium in Balad Air Base, Iraq. WWE Diva Eve Torres served as ring announcer.

2010 
The 2010 edition of the special was taped on December 11 in Fort Hood, Texas. This was the first Tribute to the Troops event not to be held in Iraq or Afghanistan. Diddy, Sherri Shepherd, Miss USA Rima Fakih, Trace Adkins and Cedric the Entertainer appeared as celebrity guests. Modern Family cast member Ariel Winter sang The Star-Spangled Banner (though the performance did not air). Two versions of the program aired: a 60-minute version on December 18, 2010 on NBC and a two-hour version on December 22, 2010 on USA Network. The NBC broadcast only included the tag team and 6-man tag team matches listed below.

2011 
The 2011 edition of the special was taped on December 11, 2011 at the Crown Coliseum in Fayetteville, North Carolina, in the attendance of U.S. service members from nearby Fort Bragg and their families. It aired December 13 on USA Network, while NBC aired an edited, one-hour version (consisting of only the first and last matches) on December 17.

The event featured a pre-recorded message from President Barack Obama. Nickelback performed "Burn It to the Ground" (the current Raw theme song) and "When We Stand Together". Sgt. Slaughter made a special appearance, supporting Zack Ryder ringside. Maria Menounos also made a special guest appearance, teaming with Alicia Fox, Eve Torres, and Kelly Kelly to defeat The Divas of Doom (Beth Phoenix and Natalya) and The Bella Twins (Brie Bella and Nikki Bella) in an Eight-Diva tag team match, in which she pinned down Phoenix for the victory. George Wallace performed some stand-up comedy. Mary J. Blige performed "Need Someone" and "Family Affair".

2012 
The 2012 edition of the special was taped on December 9 at The Scope in Norfolk, Virginia (billed as Naval Station Norfolk). USA Network aired a two-hour version of the show, which included all 5 matches, on December 19, while NBC aired a one-hour version three nights later, which included only the first and last match. The broadcast began with a pre-recorded message from President Barack Obama, featured musical performances from Flo Rida and Kid Rock, and a special Miz TV segment with Kermit the Frog and Miss Piggy.

2013 
The 2013 edition of the special was taped on December 11 at the Joint Base Lewis-McChord in Tacoma, Washington, and aired December 28 on NBC. The official theme songs for the event are "Here's To Us" by Kevin Rudolf, "People Back Home" by Florida Georgia Line and "Waiting For Superman" by Daughtry. Daughtry and Jeff Dunham performed with Peanut (They read Twas the Night Before Christmas, Similar to what they did with their 2008 special, except it was censored and they didn't read it all the way through) with the former SportsNation host Michelle Beadle hosting.

The other participants were: Aksana, Alicia Fox, Cameron, Eva Marie, JoJo, Kaitlyn, Naomi, Natalya, Nikki Bella, and Rosa Mendes.

2014 
The 2014 edition of the special was taped on December 9 in Columbus, Georgia (referred to on-air as Fort Benning). It aired on December 17 on the USA Network. The broadcast also aired on December 27 on NBC. The official theme song for the event is "This Is How We Roll" by Florida Georgia Line, who also performed live at the event. Hulk Hogan also made a special appearance.

The other participants were: Alicia Fox, Brie Bella, Cameron, Emma, Nikki Bella, Paige, Rosa Mendes, and Summer Rae.

2015 
The 2015 edition of the special was taped on December 8 at the Jacksonville Veterans Memorial Arena in Jacksonville, Florida. It aired on December 23 on the USA Network. Howie Mandel and the band Train also performed live at the event. JoJo also performed the national anthem in the beginning of the show. Michael Cole and John "Bradshaw" Layfield were the commentators.

2016 
The 2016 edition of the special was taped on December 13 at the Verizon Center in Washington, D.C. It aired on December 14 on the USA Network. This was the first multi-branded special event since the 2010 edition, after the reintroduction of the WWE brand extension. Lilian Garcia performed the national anthem for the last time since she parted ways with company that year, before later appearing again for WWE. Commentators for the year's event were Michael Cole, Byron Saxton, and John "Bradshaw" Layfield. Gabriel Iglesias also made a special appearance.

2017 
The 2017 edition of the special was taped on December 5 at the Naval Station San Diego in San Diego, California. It aired on December 14 on the USA Network.

2018
The 2018 edition of the special was taped on December 4 at the Fort Hood in Killeen, Texas. It aired on December 20 on the USA Network.

2019 
The 2019 edition of the event was held on December 6 at the Marine Corps Air Station New River and Marine Corps Base Camp Lejeune in Jacksonville, North Carolina. Unlike other editions, the 2019 event was not aired on television.

2020
The 2020 edition of the event was held on December 6. Due to the COVID-19 pandemic, the event was held behind closed doors by way of the WWE ThunderDome bio-secure bubble, hosted at the Amway Center in Orlando, Florida. It marked the first time the company did not travel to a military base since the event's inception in 2003. It aired midday on FOX adjacent to the NFL broadcasts. Hardy also performed live at the event.

2021
The 2021 edition of the event was held on October 15 at the Toyota Arena in Ontario, California. It aired on November 14 on FOX, being the first Tribute to the Troops to not air in December.

2022 
The 2022 edition of the event was held on November 11 at the Gainbridge Fieldhouse in Downtown Indianapolis. It aired on December 17 on FOX.

References

External links 
 

Tribute to the Troops
Professional wrestling in Iraq
Professional wrestling in Afghanistan
Professional wrestling in Texas
Professional wrestling in North Carolina
Professional wrestling in Virginia
Professional wrestling in Washington (state)
Professional wrestling in Georgia (U.S. state)
Professional wrestling in Jacksonville, Florida
Professional wrestling in Washington, D.C.
Professional wrestling in San Diego
WWE international